The 1980–81 QMJHL season was the 12th season in the history of the Quebec Major Junior Hockey League. The league inaugurated three new trophies for players. The Marcel Robert Trophy is first awarded to the "Best Scholastic Player" and the Mike Bossy Trophy is first awarded to the "Best Professional Prospect" for the upcoming NHL Entry Draft. The league created a second Rookie of the Year award. The existing Michel Bergeron Trophy becomes the "Offensive" Rookie of the Year award, and the Raymond Lagacé Trophy is first awarded to the "Defensive" Rookie of the Year.

Ten teams played 72 games each in the schedule. The defending champion Cornwall Royals finished first overall in the regular season, winning the Jean Rougeau Trophy, and won their third, and second consecutive President's Cup, defeating the Trois-Rivières Draveurs in the finals. The Royals went on to win their third, and second consecutive Memorial Cup championship at the 1981 Memorial Cup tournament.

Team changes
 The Sorel Éperviers remain in Sorel, Quebec after a mid-season move the previous season.

Final standings
Note: GP = Games played; W = Wins; L = Losses; T = Ties; PTS = Points; GF = Goals for; GA = Goals against

complete list of standings.

Scoring leaders
Note: GP = Games played; G = Goals; A = Assists; Pts = Points; PIM = Penalties in minutes

 complete scoring statistics

Playoffs
Alain Lemieux was the leading scorer of the playoffs with 49 points (18 goals, 31 assists).

Quarterfinals
 Cornwall Royals defeated Quebec Remparts 4 games to 3.
 Trois-Rivières Draveurs defeated Montreal Juniors 4 games to 3.
 Chicoutimi Saguenéens defeated Shawinigan Cataractes 4 games to 1.
 Sherbrooke Castors defeated Sorel Éperviers 4 games to 3.

Semifinals
 Cornwall Royals defeated Sherbrooke Castors 4 games to 3.
 Trois-Rivières Draveurs defeated Chicoutimi Saguenéens 4 games to 3.

Finals
 Cornwall Royals defeated Trois-Rivières Draveurs 4 games to 1.

All-star teams
First team
 Goaltender - Corrado Micalef, Sherbrooke Castors 
 Left defence - Pierre Sevigny, Trois-Rivières Draveurs
 Right defence - Fred Boimistruck, Cornwall Royals
 Left winger - Normand Lefrancois, Trois-Rivières Draveurs
 Centreman - Dale Hawerchuk, Cornwall Royals 
 Right winger - Sean McKenna, Sherbrooke Castors  
 Coach - Andre Boisvert, Sherbrooke Castors
Second team
 Goaltender - Michel Dufor, Sorel Éperviers  
 Left defence - Robert Savard, Cornwall Royals
 Right defence - Gilbert Delorme, Chicoutimi Saguenéens 
 Left winger - Normand Leveille, Chicoutimi Saguenéens
 Centreman - Alain Lemieux, Trois-Rivières Draveurs
 Right winger - Jean-Marc Gaulin, Sorel Éperviers
 Coach - Bob Kilger, Cornwall Royals
 List of First/Second/Rookie team all-stars.

Trophies and awards
Team
President's Cup - Playoff Champions, Cornwall Royals
Jean Rougeau Trophy - Regular Season Champions, Cornwall Royals
Robert Lebel Trophy - Team with best GAA, Sorel Éperviers

Player
Michel Brière Memorial Trophy - Most Valuable Player, Dale Hawerchuk, Cornwall Royals
Jean Béliveau Trophy - Top Scorer, Dale Hawerchuk, Cornwall Royals
Guy Lafleur Trophy - Playoff MVP, Alain Lemieux, Trois-Rivières Draveurs
Jacques Plante Memorial Trophy - Best GAA, Michel Dufour, Sorel Éperviers
Emile Bouchard Trophy - Defenceman of the Year, Fred Boimistruck, Cornwall Royals
Mike Bossy Trophy - Best Pro Prospect, Dale Hawerchuk, Cornwall Royals
Michel Bergeron Trophy - Offensive Rookie of the Year, Claude Verret, Trois-Rivières Draveurs
Raymond Lagacé Trophy - Defensive Rookie of the Year, Billy Campbell, Montreal Juniors 
Frank J. Selke Memorial Trophy - Most sportsmanlike player, Claude Verret, Trois-Rivières Draveurs
Marcel Robert Trophy - Best Scholastic Player, Francois Lecomte, Montreal Juniors

See also
1981 Memorial Cup
1981 NHL Entry Draft
1980–81 OHL season
1980–81 WHL season

References
 Official QMJHL Website
 www.hockeydb.com/

Quebec Major Junior Hockey League seasons
QMJHL